The Colombian Athletics Championships is an annual track and field competition which serves as the national championship for Colombia. It is organised by Colombian Athletics Federation (FECODATLE), Colombia's national governing body for the sport of athletics. The event was held for its 50th edition in 2005. Since 1992, the competition is held in conjunction with the National Games of Colombia when that competition is held, once every four years.

Men

100 metres
1991: Robinson Urrutia
1992: Wenceslao Ferrín
1993: ?
1994: Robinson Urrutia
1995: Robinson Urrutia
1996: Robinson Urrutia
1997: 
1998: Robinson Urrutia
1999: Jimmy Pino
2000: John Córdoba
2001: John Córdoba
2002: Jimmy Pino
2003: Jimmy Pino
2004: John Córdoba
2005: Daniel Grueso
2006: Harlin Echavarría

200 metres
1991: Nicolás Valencia
1992: Wenceslao Ferrín
1993: Luis Vega
1994: Wenceslao Ferrín
1995: Wenceslao Ferrín
1996: Wilson Cañizales
1997: Wilson Cañizales
1998: José Luis Herrera
1999: John Córdoba
2000: John Córdoba
2001: John Córdoba
2002: Jimmy Pino
2003: John Córdoba
2004: John Valoyes
2005: Daniel Grueso
2006: Daniel Grueso

400 metres
1991: Nicolás Valencia
1992: Norman Popo
1993: Wilson Cañizales
1994: Wilson Cañizales
1995: Wenceslao Ferrín
1996: Wilson Cañizales
1997: Wenceslao Ferrín
1998: Julio César Rojas
1999: Llimy Rivas
2000: Milcíades Cantillo
2001: Jagnner Palacios
2002: John Chávez
2003: Julio César Rojas
2004: Carlos Peña
2005: Carlos Peña
2006: Yeimar Mosquera

800 metres
1991: Javier Bermúdez
1992: Javier Bermúdez
1993: Víctor Cano
1994: Diego Córdoba
1995: Alcides Pinto
1996: Alcides Pinto
1997: John Chávez
1998: José Luis Hincapié
1999: José Luis Hincapié
2000: John Chávez
2001: José Bermúdez
2002: John Chávez
2003: José Bermúdez
2004: Edgar Rivera
2005: John Chávez
2006: John Chávez

1500 metres
1991: Rafael Uribe
1992: Rafael Uribe
1993: Herder Vásquez
1994: Jacinto Navarrete
1995: Jacinto Navarrete
1996: Jacinto Navarrete
1997: Rolando Ortiz
1998: 
1999: Mauricio Ladino
2000: Alonso Pérez
2001: José Perea
2002: Mauricio Ladino
2003: Mauricio Ladino
2004: Oscar Lesmes
2005: John Chávez
2006: John Chávez

5000 metres
1991: Herder Vásquez
1992: Herder Vásquez
1993: Herder Vásquez
1994: Jacinto Navarrete
1995: Herder Vásquez
1996: Herder Vásquez
1997: Herder Vásquez
1998: Jacinto López
1999: Mauricio Ladino
2000: Diego Colorado
2001: William Naranjo
2002: William Naranjo
2003: Jacinto López
2004: Jacinto López
2005: Rolando Ortiz
2006: Javier Guarín

10,000 metres
1991: Herder Vásquez
1992: Herder Vásquez
1993: Jacinto López
1994: Herder Vásquez
1995: Herder Vásquez
1996: Herder Vásquez
1997: Herder Vásquez
1998: Juan Gutiérrez
1999: Herder Vásquez
2000: Herder Vásquez
2001: William Roldán
2002: William Naranjo
2003: William Naranjo
2004: Jacinto López
2005: Jason Gutiérrez
2006: Jacinto López

Half marathon
2005: Herder Vásquez

Marathon
1991: ?
1992: Jaime Cuitiva
1993: ?
1994: ?
1995: ?
1996: ?
1997: ?
1998: ?
1999: ?
2000: Hugo Jiménez
2001: ?
2002: Jorge Real
2003: ?
2004: Jorge Real

3000 metres steeplechase
1991: Leonardo García
1992: Wilson Munevar
1993: Leonardo García
1994: Gonzalo Vanegas
1995: Gonzalo Vanegas
1996: Gonzalo Vanegas
1997: Diego Grisales
1998: 
1999: William Peña
2000: Diego Grisales
2001: Richard Rosero
2002: Richard Rosero
2003: John Vargas
2004: Julio Pulido
2005: Wilder Álvarez
2006: Wilder Álvarez

110 metres hurdles
1991: José Humberto Rivas
1992: ?
1993: Julian González
1994: José Humberto Rivas
1995: José Humberto Rivas
1996: Julian González
1997: José Humberto Rivas
1998: José Humberto Rivas
1999: Paulo Villar
2000: Paulo Villar
2001: Paulo Villar
2002: Heiner Rovira
2003: Paulo Villar
2004: Paulo Villar
2005: Paulo Villar
2006: Paulo Villar

400 metres hurdles
1991: Leonel Pedroza
1992: ?
1993: Llimy Rivas
1994: Llimy Rivas
1995: Llimy Rivas
1996: Llimy Rivas
1997: Llimy Rivas
1998: Alexander Mena
1999: Llimy Rivas
2000: Alexander Mena
2001: José Carvajal
2002: Llimy Rivas
2003: Alexander Mena
2004: Paulo Villar
2005: Oscar Candanoza
2006: Paulo Villar

High jump
1991: Gilmar Mayo
1992: Gilmar Mayo
1993: Gilmar Mayo
1994: Gilmar Mayo
1995: Gilmar Mayo
1996: Gilmar Mayo
1997: Gilmar Mayo
1998: Gilmar Mayo
1999: Gilmar Mayo
2000: Gilmar Mayo
2001: Gilmar Mayo
2002: Gilmar Mayo
2003: Gilmar Mayo
2004: Gilmar Mayo
2005: Gilmar Mayo
2006: Gilmar Mayo

Pole vault
1991: Norberto García
1992: Miguel Saldarriaga
1993: William Amador
1994: Juan Jaramillo
1995: ?
1996: Miguel Saldarriaga
1997: Miguel Saldarriaga
1998: 
1999: Jackson Angulo
2000: Oscar Sánchez
2001: Jackson Angulo
2002: Oscar Romer
2003: David Rojas
2004: David Rojas
2005: Víctor Medina
2006: David Rojas

Long jump
1991: Lewis Asprilla
1992: Luis Lorduy
1993: Oscar Acosta
1994: Lewis Asprilla
1995: Lewis Asprilla
1996: Lewis Asprilla
1997: Lewis Asprilla
1998: Lewis Asprilla
1999: Lewis Asprilla
2000: Alvin Rentería
2001: Lewis Asprilla
2002: Lewis Asprilla
2003: Dainler Griego
2004: Marcos Ibargüen
2005: Lewis Asprilla
2006: Marcos Ibargüen

Triple jump
1991: Gilmar Mayo
1992: Gilmar Mayo
1993: Gilmar Mayo
1994: Gilmar Mayo
1995: Leisner Aragón
1996: Leisner Aragón
1997: Leisner Aragón
1998: Gilmar Mayo
1999: Alvin Rentería
2000: Leisner Aragón
2001: Alvin Rentería
2002: Alvin Rentería
2003: Leisner Aragón
2004: Alvin Rentería
2005: Carlos Carabalí
2006: Carlos Carabalí

Shot put
1991: Celso Aragón
1992: Celso Aragón
1993: Celso Aragón
1994: Orlando Ibarra
1995: Orlando Ibarra
1996: Orlando Ibarra
1997: Jhonny Rodríguez
1998: Orlando Ibarra
1999: Orlando Ibarra
2000: Orlando Ibarra
2001: Jhonny Rodríguez
2002: Orlando Ibarra
2003: Jhonny Rodríguez
2004: Geovanny García
2005: Jhonny Rodríguez
2006: Jhonny Rodríguez

Discus throw
1991: Luis Fernando Garrido
1992: Rogelio Ospino
1993: Rogelio Ospino
1994: Isaac Vallecilla
1995: Rogelio Ospino
1996: Rogelio Ospino
1997: ?
1998: Rogelio Ospino
1999: Julián Angulo
2000: Orlando Ibarra
2001: Orlando Ibarra
2002: Orlando Ibarra
2003: Julián Angulo
2004: Julián Angulo
2005: Jhonny Rodríguez
2006: Julián Angulo

Hammer throw
1991: David Castrillón
1992: David Castrillón
1993: Fredy Mendoza
1994: Fabián Vera
1995: Roberto Lozano
1996: David Castrillón
1997: David Castrillón
1998: David Castrillón
1999: Fabián Vera
2000: Fabián Vera
2001: Fabián Vera
2002: Fabián Vera
2003: Freimar Arias
2004: Freimar Arias
2005: Freimar Arias
2006: Freimar Arias

Javelin throw
1991: Luis Lucumí
1992: Luis Lucumí
1993: Luis Lucumí
1994: Luis Lucumí
1995: Luis Lucumí
1996: Luis Lucumí
1997: Luis Lucumí
1998: Luis Lucumí
1999: Luis Lucumí
2000: Noraldo Palacios
2001: Noraldo Palacios
2002: Noraldo Palacios
2003: Noraldo Palacios
2004: Noraldo Palacios
2005: Noraldo Palacios
2006: Noraldo Palacios

Decathlon
1991: Luis Banquero
1992: Arnold Chara
1993: ?
1994: Cecilio Escobar
1995: Cecilio Escobar
1996: Cecilio Escobar
1997: Luis Banquero
1998: Luis Banquero
1999: Leonel Gómez
2000: Jackson Angulo
2001: Jackson Angulo
2002: Jhon Urrutia
2003: Robinson Urrutia
2004: Andrés Mantilla
2005: José Gómez
2006: José Gómez

20 kilometres walk
The competition was contested on a track in 1998, 2000, 2002, 2003 and 2005.
1991: Querubín Moreno
1992: Querubín Moreno
1993: Orlando Díaz
1994: Héctor Moreno
1995: Querubín Moreno
1996: Héctor Moreno
1997: Querubín Moreno
1998: Pedro Castro
1999: Orlando Díaz
2000: John Jairo García
2001: Fernando López
2002: Fernando López
2003: Fernando López
2004: Fernando López
2005: Fernando López
2006: James Rendón

35 kilometres walk
The 1993 event was short at 30 km.
1993: Querubín Moreno
1994: Rodrigo Moreno
1995: Wilson Vargas

50 kilometres walk
1991: Rodrigo Moreno
1992: Clodomiro Moreno
1993: Not held
1994: Not held
1995: Not held
1996: Fernando Roso
1997:?
1998:?
1999:?
2000: Joaquín Córdoba
2001:?
2002: Not held
2003:?
2004: Rodrigo Moreno
2005:?
2006:?

Women

100 metres
1991: Alejandra Quiñones
1992: Ximena Restrepo
1993: Patricia Rodríguez
1994: Mirtha Brock
1995: Zandra Borrero
1996: Mirtha Brock
1997: Felipa Palacios
1998: Mirtha Brock
1999: Mirtha Brock
2000: Digna Luz Murillo
2001: Mirtha Brock
2002: Norma González
2003: Melisa Murillo
2004: Melisa Murillo
2005: Yomara Hinestroza
2006: Felipa Palacios

200 metres
1991: Ximena Restrepo
1992: Ximena Restrepo
1993: Patricia Rodríguez
1994: Patricia Rodríguez
1995: Patricia Rodríguez
1996: Patricia Rodríguez
1997: Felipa Palacios
1998: Mirtha Brock
1999: Felipa Palacios
2000: Felipa Palacios
2001: Miriam Caicedo
2002: Norma González
2003: Digna Luz Murillo
2004: Norma González
2005: Darlenys Obregón
2006: Darlenys Obregón

400 metres
1991: Ximena Restrepo
1992: Norfalia Carabalí
1993: Janeth Lucumí
1994: Flor Robledo
1995: Patricia Rodríguez
1996: Norfalia Carabalí
1997: Norfalia Carabalí
1998: Norfalia Carabalí
1999: Patricia Rodríguez
2000: Norma González
2001: Norma González
2002: Mirtha Brock
2003: Rosibel García
2004: Norma González
2005: Norma González
2006: Norma González

800 metres
1991: Amparo Alba
1992: Martha Gómez
1993: Martha Gómez
1994: Flor Robledo
1995: Norfalia Carabalí
1996: Norfalia Carabalí
1997: Norfalia Carabalí
1998: Janeth Lucumí
1999: Janeth Lucumí
2000: Janeth Lucumí
2001: Rosibel García
2002: Rosibel García
2003: Rosibel García
2004: Rosibel García
2005: Rosibel García
2006: Rosibel García

1500 metres
1991: Amparo Alba
1992: Amparo Alba
1993: Rocío Estrada
1994: Julieth Mendoza
1995: Bertha Sánchez
1996: Bertha Sánchez
1997: Rosa Mila Ibarra
1998: Bertha Sánchez
1999: Bertha Sánchez
2000: Sandra Villa
2001: Bertha Sánchez
2002: Bertha Sánchez
2003: Bertha Sánchez
2004: Rosibel García
2005: Rosibel García
2006: Rosibel García

3000 metres
1991: Rosa Mila Ibarra
1992: Stella Castro
1993: Stella Castro
1994: Iglandini González

5000 metres
1995: Bertha Sánchez
1996: Stella Castro
1997: Bertha Sánchez
1998: Bertha Sánchez
1999: Bertha Sánchez
2000: Stella Castro
2001: Bertha Sánchez
2002: Bertha Sánchez
2003: Bertha Sánchez
2004: Bertha Sánchez
2005: Bertha Sánchez
2006: Ana Joaquina Rondor

10,000 metres
1991: Esneda Londoño
1992:?
1993: Stella Castro
1994: Stella Castro
1995: Esneda Londoño
1996: Stella Castro
1997: Stella Castro
1998: Iglandini González
1999: Stella Castro
2000: Stella Castro
2001: Iglandini González
2002: Bertha Sánchez
2003: Bertha Sánchez
2004: Rosalba García
2005: Bertha Sánchez
2006: Bertha Sánchez

Half marathon
2005: Bertha Sánchez

Marathon
1991: ?
1992: Teresa Allende
1993: ?
1994: ?
1995: ?
1996: ?
1997: ?
1998: ?
1999: ?
2000: Sandra León
2001: ?
2002: Rosalba García
2003: ?
2004: Claudia Tangarife

3000 metres steeplechase
2001: Bertha Sánchez
2002: Yolanda Caballero
2003: Diana Alzate
2004: María Guerrero
2005: Ángela Figueroa
2006: Bertha Sánchez

100 metres hurdles
1991: Zorobabelia Córdoba
1992: Zorobabelia Córdoba
1993: Martha Dinas
1994: Martha Dinas
1995: Martha Dinas
1996: Martha Dinas
1997: Princesa Oliveros
1998: Alejandra Quiñones
1999: Princesa Oliveros
2000: Princesa Oliveros
2001: Brigitte Merlano
2002: Princesa Oliveros
2003: Princesa Oliveros
2004: Princesa Oliveros
2005: Brigitte Merlano
2006: Princesa Oliveros

400 metres hurdles
1991: Maribelsy Peña
1992: Maribelsy Peña
1993: ?
1994: Flor Robledo
1995: Maribelsy Peña
1996: ?
1997: Flor Robledo
1998: Flor Robledo
1999: Princesa Oliveros
2000: Princesa Oliveros
2001: Rosibel García
2002: Princesa Oliveros
2003: Princesa Oliveros
2004: Princesa Oliveros
2005: Dinelba Hinestroza
2006: Princesa Oliveros

High jump
1991: Nadia Katich
1992: Janeth Lagoyete
1993: Janeth Lagoyete
1994: Fernanda Mosquera
1995: Fernanda Mosquera
1996: Janeth Lagoyete
1997: Janeth Lagoyete
1998: Zorobabelia Córdoba
1999: Caterine Ibargüen
2000: Lida Torres
2001: Caterine Ibargüen
2002: Caterine Ibargüen
2003: Caterine Ibargüen
2004: Caterine Ibargüen
2005: Caterine Ibargüen
2006: Caterine Ibargüen

Pole vault
1997: Carolina de la Cuesta
1998: 
1999: Carolina de la Cuesta
2000: Milena Agudelo
2001: Milena Agudelo
2002: Milena Agudelo
2003: Milena Agudelo
2004: Milena Agudelo
2005: Karina Quejada
2006: Milena Agudelo

Long jump
1991: Zorobabelia Córdoba
1992: Betty Ambuila
1993: Zorobabelia Córdoba
1994: Helena Guerrero
1995: Helena Guerrero
1996: Alejandra Quiñones
1997: Alejandra Quiñones
1998: Yorly Lasso
1999: Clara Córdoba
2000: Helena Guerrero
2001: Helena Guerrero
2002: Helena Guerrero
2003: Caterine Ibargüen
2004: Caterine Ibargüen
2005: Helena Guerrero
2006: Caterine Ibargüen

Triple jump
1992: Milly Figueroa
1993: ?
1994: Milly Figueroa
1995: Milly Figueroa
1996: Clara Córdoba
1997: Clara Córdoba
1998: 
1999: Clara Córdoba
2000: Clara Córdoba
2001: Ivonne Patarroyo
2002: Caterine Ibargüen
2003: Caterine Ibargüen
2004: Caterine Ibargüen
2005: Caterine Ibargüen
2006: Johanna Triviño

Shot put
1991: María Isabel Urrutia
1992: María Isabel Urrutia
1993: María Isabel Urrutia
1994: María Isabel Urrutia
1995: María Isabel Urrutia
1996: María Isabel Urrutia
1997: María Isabel Urrutia
1998: María Isabel Urrutia
1999: María Isabel Urrutia
2000: Luz Dary Castro
2001: Luz Dary Castro
2002: Luz Dary Castro
2003: Luz Dary Castro
2004: Leidy Arboleda
2005: Luz Dary Castro
2006: Luz Dary Castro

Discus throw
1991: María Isabel Urrutia
1992: María Isabel Urrutia
1993: María Isabel Urrutia
1994: María Isabel Urrutia
1995: María Isabel Urrutia
1996: María Isabel Urrutia
1997: María Isabel Urrutia
1998: María Isabel Urrutia
1999: Denis Córdoba
2000: Luz Dary Castro
2001: Luz Dary Castro
2002: Luz Dary Castro
2003: Luz Dary Castro
2004: Arelis Quiñones
2005: Luz Dary Castro
2006: Luz Dary Castro

Hammer throw
1993: María Eugenia Villamizar
1994: María Eugenia Villamizar
1995: María Eugenia Villamizar
1996: María Eugenia Villamizar
1997: María Eugenia Villamizar
1998: María Eugenia Villamizar
1999: María Eugenia Villamizar
2000: María Eugenia Villamizar
2001: María Eugenia Villamizar
2002: María Eugenia Villamizar
2003: Yaiza Córdoba
2004: Johana Ramírez
2005: Johana Ramírez
2006: Johana Moreno

Javelin throw
1991: Verónica Prieto
1992: Zorobabelia Córdoba
1993: Berta Gómez
1994: Zuleima Araméndiz
1995: Zuleima Araméndiz
1996: Zuleima Araméndiz
1997: Zuleima Araméndiz
1998: Sabina Moya
1999: Zuleima Araméndiz
2000: Zuleima Araméndiz
2001: Zuleima Araméndiz
2002: Zuleima Araméndiz
2003: Sabina Moya
2004: Zuleima Araméndiz
2005: Tatiana Valencia
2006: Zuleima Araméndiz

Heptathlon
1991:?
1992: Milly Figueroa
1993: ?
1994:?
1995: Judith Rivas
1996: Zorobabelia Córdoba
1997:?
1998: Zorobabelia Córdoba
1999: Flor Robledo
2000: Zorobabelia Córdoba
2001: Zorobabelia Córdoba
2002: Nasly Perea
2003: Yolanda Mina
2004: Nasly Perea
2005: Nasly Perea
2006: Nasly Perea

10 kilometres walk
1991: Gloria Moreno
1992: Gloria Moreno
1993: Liliana Bermeo
1994: Cristina Bohórquez
1995: Liliana Bermeo
1996: Liliana Bermeo
1997: Liliana Bermeo
1998: Sandra Zapata

20 kilometres walk
The 2000, 2002 and 2003 events were contested on a track.
1999: Cristina Bohórquez
2000: Cristina Bohórquez
2001: Cristina Bohórquez
2002: Sandra Zapata
2003: Sandra Zapata
2004: Sandra Zapata
2005: Sandra Zapata
2006: Sandra Zapata

References

Champions 1991–2006
Colombian Championships. GBR Athletics. Retrieved 2021-01-29.

Winners
 List
Colombian Championships
Athletics